Dharma Manikya II (died 1729) was the king of Tripura Kingdom from 1713 to 1725 and again in 1729, although his power was greatly diminished in 1732 with the rise to power of Jagat Manikya with the aid of the Nawab of Bengal, Shuja-ud-Din Muhammad Khan.

References

Sources

See also
Manikya dynasty
Tripura (princely state)

Kings of Tripura
History of Tripura
1733 deaths
Year of birth unknown